Amietia is a genus of frogs, commonly known as large-mouthed frogs or river frogs, in the family Pyxicephalidae. They are endemic to central and southern Africa. Formerly, the genus was  named Afrana and was placed in the family Ranidae.

Etymology
The generic name, Amietia, is in honor of French herpetologist Jean-Louis Amiet.

Species
The following species are recognised in the genus Amietia:
 Amietia angolensis (Bocage, 1866), Angola river frog, common river frog
 Amietia chapini (Noble, 1924)
 Amietia delalandii (Duméril and Bibron, 1841)
 Amietia desaegeri (Laurent, 1972)
 Amietia fuscigula (A.M.C. Duméril and Bibron, 1841), Cape river frog
 Amietia hymenopus (Boulenger, 1920)
 Amietia inyangae (Poynton, 1966), Inyangani river frog
 Amietia johnstoni (Günther, 1894), Johnston's river frog
 Amietia moyerorum (Channing, Dehling, Lötters, and Ernst, 2016)
 Amietia nutti (Boulenger, 1896)
 Amietia poyntoni (Channing and Baptista, 2013)
 Amietia ruwenzorica (Laurent, 1972)
 Amietia tenuoplicata (Pickersgill, 2007)
 Amietia vandijki (Visser and Channing, 1997)
 Amietia vertebralis (Hewitt, 1927), Ice frog
 Amietia wittei (Angel, 1924)

References

 
Amphibians of Sub-Saharan Africa
Pyxicephalidae
Amphibian genera
Taxonomy articles created by Polbot